Lux Prima is a collaborative studio album by American singer-songwriter Karen O and Danger Mouse. It was released in March 2019 under BMG Records.

Composition
With Lux Prima, the duo craft "sprawling, soulful [and] cinematic" psych rock. 1960s orchestral pop and the "packed and dusty" sound of 1990s trip hop are also worked in. Other styles featured include disco, funk, soul, and lounge-pop.

Track listing
All music produced by Danger Mouse.

Personnel
Sourced from AllMusic.

Karen O & Danger Mouse
 Karen Orzolek - lead & background vocals , synthesizers , electric guitar , acoustic guitar ; string arrangements
 Brian Burton - background vocals , synth bass , Wurlitzer , synthesizers , percussion , drum programming , electric guitar , acoustic guitar , bass , drums , strings , organ , Mellotron , programming ; horn & string arrangements

Additional musicians
 Sam Cohen - bass , electric guitar , synthesizer , drums 
 David Christian - drums 
 Héctor Delgado - drum programming 
 Jared Samuel - piano , Wurlitzer , Rhodes 
 Nick Zinner - electric guitars 
 Daniele Luppi - string arrangements, string conductor
 Mei Chang, Sharon Jackson, Marina Manukian, Cameron Patrick, Benjamin Powell, Kathleen Robertson, Erika Walczak - violin
 Adriana Zoppo - viola
 Stefanie Fife - cello
 Chris Tedesco - music contractor, trombone & trumpet

Charts

References

2019 albums
Karen O albums
Danger Mouse (musician) albums
Albums produced by Danger Mouse (musician)
Albums recorded at Kingsize Soundlabs
Albums recorded at Electric Lady Studios
Psychedelic rock albums